Turkey Creek is a stream in Johnson and Wyandotte counties, Kansas, United States. It is a tributary of the Kansas River, with its mouth near downtown Kansas City.  The stream is prone to flooding—a flood in 1998 caused more than $50 million in damage—and so the U.S. Army Corps of Engineers implemented flood control measures.  The last  of the stream runs through a tunnel.

See also
List of rivers of Kansas

References

Tributaries of the Kansas River
Geography of Kansas City, Kansas
Rivers of Johnson County, Kansas
Rivers of Wyandotte County, Kansas
Rivers of Kansas
Tributaries of the Missouri River
Subterranean rivers of the United States